Calvary, Wisconsin is an unincorporated community located in the town of Marshfield, in Fond du Lac County, Wisconsin. The community was originally known locally as Calvary Station since the community was built around the railroad depot for Mount Calvary. The depot for the Sheboygan-Fond du Lac Railroad needed to be built about 1 mile (2 km) north of the community because of the grade needed for trains to climb the Niagara Escarpment. It is located at the intersection of County Highways WW and WH (which was named Wisconsin Highway 149 before the highway was decommissioned in the 2000s). It is located in the heart of the Blue Sky Green Field Wind Farm in Wisconsin's Holyland Region.

Images

References

Unincorporated communities in Wisconsin
Unincorporated communities in Fond du Lac County, Wisconsin